Ali Ismael (December 28, 1922 – June 16, 1974) was an Egyptian musician and composer, he is famous for his Egyptian patriotic songs especially his mega-hit "Rayheen Fe Edina Selah". He also wrote the music for Fida'i, a song with lyrics by Said Al Muzayin that in 1996 was made the Palestinian National Anthem by the PLO.

His compositions are used in over 350 Egyptian movies; he died in Cairo.  See the documentary film, Ali Ismael: Egypt’s Musical Maestro.

Regional work 
Ali is also the composer of the Palestinian national anthem.

Egyptian composers
Egyptian musicians
1922 births
1974 deaths
20th-century composers
National anthem writers